The Military ranks of Dominican Republic are the military insignia used by the Armed Forces of the Dominican Republic.

Commissioned officer ranks
The rank insignia of commissioned officers.

Other ranks
The rank insignia of non-commissioned officers and enlisted personnel.

Former ranks

References

External links
 

Dominican Republic